Bayerotrochus poppei is a species of sea snail, a marine gastropod mollusc in the family Pleurotomariidae.

Description
The length of the shell reaches 50 mm.

Distribution
This marine species occurs in the Pacific Ocean off Tonga.

References

 Anseeuw P. 2003. A new pleurotomariid (Gastropoda: Pleurotomariidae) from Tonga Islands, South Pacific, Bayerotrochus poppei sp. n. Novapex 4(1): 11–16

External links
 

Pleurotomariidae
Gastropods described in 2003